Shiraoi may refer to:
 Shiraoi, Hokkaidō, a town in Hokkaido
 Shiraoi District, Hokkaidō, a district in Hokkaido